The International Mini Meet or International Mini Meeting is a campaign event for Mini owners and drivers which started in Germany in 1978. The Meet is organised by a collection of Mini clubs. Its goal is to bring together Mini enthusiasts from around the world.

The event caters to the interests of Mini drivers, as well as those looking to purchase the car. Besides the purely automotive aspect of the meet, participants can also take part in treasure hunts, slalom races, and other Mini-themed events.

Schedule
The Meet starts on a Thursday afternoon. An official welcome gathering occurs that evening, which includes a presentation of all participating clubs.

On Saturday, the presidents' meeting takes place. During this meeting, individual clubs can make a presentation in hopes of winning the right to host a future event. Saturday evening usually brings a themed party.

On Sunday, a form of cavalcade, featuring various Minis, is held. On Sunday evening, the event is closed by a formal handover of "the event key" to the club organizing it the year after.

Location
Every year the event takes place in a different country, usually around the Whitsun weekend. The club's rules provide also that every 5 years since 1989 (counting from 1959), the event be celebrated in England, the birthplace of the Mini car. These conventions usually take place in August.

Event history

References 

Auto shows
Mini vehicles
Annual events in Europe